Sprowston ( or ) is a small suburban town bordering Norwich in Norfolk, England. It is bounded by Heartsease to the east, Mousehold Heath and the suburb of New Sprowston to the south (in Norwich), Old Catton to the west, and by the open farmland of Beeston St Andrew to the north.

The 2011 census recorded a population of 14,691 making Sprowston the most populous civil parish in Broadland district.

History
Sprowston was recorded (as 'Sprowestuna') in the Domesday Book of 1086. The name is Anglo-Saxon and means 'the settlement belonging to Sprow' and is derived from the OE Sprow and tun (enclosure, settlement or farm)

By 1186 one Manor was held by the Mounteney family, on behalf of Sir Richard de Luci, who kept it for some 250 years, whilst the other, held by the de Sproustons and then the Aslakes, was owned by the Bishop of Norwich.
In 1545 the Jermy family granted Mounteney Manor to John Corbet. During Kett's rebellion in 1549 the house was broken into and looted. The army of Robert Kett encamped on nearby Mousehold Heath.

The first Sprowston Hall was built in 1560.

The Aslakes Manor passed to an eminent family of Norfolk gentry, the Calthorpes (subsequently related by marriage to family of Anne Boleyn). It was later sold to Sir Thomas Corbet (owner of Mounteney Manor) and in 1592 the two Manors were united.

Monuments to the Corbet family can be found at the parish church of St Mary and St Margaret Church Lane. The Sprowston Corbets were Royalists in the English Civil War; Thomas Corbet was knighted by Charles I at Royston. However, Sir Thomas' uncle, Miles Corbet, who was Member of Parliament for Great Yarmouth, was the last signatory to the death warrant of Charles I and was himself executed at the restoration of Charles II.

Sir Thomas Corbet became High Sheriff of Norfolk in 1612. He died without an heir and the manor of Sprowston was sold to Sir Thomas Adams, who had been Lord Mayor of London in 1645. He had given Charles II £10,000 whilst he was in exile, and in 1660 he accompanied General Monck to escort the King back to England.

Adams endowed a Professorship of Arabic at Cambridge and had the Gospels printed in Persian, which he described as 'throwing a stone at the head of Mahomet'. Although he died in London in 1667 his body was brought to Sprowston for burial in a barrel vault excavated under the altar at St Mary and St Margaret and a large marble monument was erected above it.

In the 18th century the manor was sold to Sir Lambert Blackwell, a governor of the South Sea Company and he was created a baronet in 1718. In the 19th century the manor went through a number of families until it came into the hands of the Gurneys. In 1876 John Gurney, who was mayor of Norwich and blind, rebuilt Sprowston Hall. In 1885 he gave money for the building of St Cuthbert's Church and a new vicarage to serve the development known as New Sprowston which was being built.
Today (2010), Sprowston Hall is now used as a hotel and is the location of Sprowston Manor Golf Club.

During the 18th century it is recorded that the population was less than 200, but by 1901 it had increased to 2,359.

Sprowston Mill was built in 1780 and made famous by John Crome, of the Norwich School of painting. It burnt down in 1933, a few days before it was to be handed over to the Norfolk Archaeological Trust, but is still used as a symbol by Sprowston Community High School and is depicted on the village sign.

The artist Thomas Lound was born in Sprowston in 1801.

Today
In 2011, Sprowston chose to move from a parish council to a town council but not to have a mayor. Sprowston Community High School, 'a mixed community comprehensive school of 1750 students,' serves ages 11–18 and has recently separated from the KETT sixth form trio, using its own independent sixth form. There are three Junior Schools: Falcon, Sprowston and White Woman Lane and three Infant Schools: Cecil Gowing, Sparhawk and Sprowston. The town has three churches: St Mary and St Margaret's (the parish church) and St Cuthbert's (both Anglican) and the Sprowston Methodist Church. There is one chapel, called Gage Road Chapel. Sprowston Hall  is now a hotel and is the location of Sprowston Manor Golf Club.

Notes

References

External links

 Sprowston Town Council
 The Parish of Sprowston
 Sprowston Community High School

Towns in Norfolk
Civil parishes in Norfolk
Areas of Norwich
Broadland